John Radcliffe (1650 – 1 November 1714) was an English physician, academic and politician. A number of landmark buildings in Oxford, including the Radcliffe Camera (in Radcliffe Square), the Radcliffe Infirmary, the Radcliffe Science Library, Radcliffe Primary Care and the Radcliffe Observatory were named after him. The John Radcliffe Hospital, a large tertiary hospital in Headington, is also named after him.

Life
Radcliffe was born the son of George Radcliffe and Anne Loader, in Wakefield, Yorkshire, where he was baptised on 23 January 1653. He was educated at Queen Elizabeth Grammar School and Northallerton Grammar School and graduated from the University of Oxford, where he was an exhibitioner at University College tutored by Obadiah Walker, to become a Fellow of Lincoln College. He obtained his MD in 1682 and moved to London shortly afterwards. There he enjoyed great popularity and became royal physician to William III and Mary II.

In 1690 he was elected Member of Parliament for Bramber, Sussex and in 1713 member for Buckingham.

On his death in the following year, his property was bequeathed to various charitable causes, including St Bartholomew's Hospital and University College, Oxford, where the Radcliffe Quad is named after him. The charitable trust founded by his will of 13 September 1714 still operates as a registered charity.

Anecdotes of Radcliffe
1. Among the many singularities related of Radcliffe, it has been noticed that, when he was in a convivial party, he was unwilling to leave it, even though sent for by persons of the highest distinction. Whilst he was thus deeply engaged at a tavern, he was called on by a grenadier, who desired his immediate attendance on his colonel; but no entreaties could prevail on the physician to postpone his revelry.

"Sir," the soldier was quoted as saying, "my orders are to bring you to the boss." And being a very powerful man, he took him up in his arms, and carried him off per force. He had betrayed his loyal friend. After traversing some dirty lanes, the doctor and his escort arrived at a narrow alley.
"What the Devil is all this," said Radcliffe, "your colonel doesn't live here?"
"No," said his military friend, "my colonel does not live here – but my comrade does, and he's worth two of the colonel, so by God, doctor, if you don't do your best for him, it will be the worst for you!"

2. To confer medical authority upon themselves, doctors of the day often published their theories, clinical findings, and pharmacopoeia (collections of "receipts" or prescriptions). Radcliffe, however, not only wrote little but also took a certain iconoclastic pride in having read little, remarking once of some vials of herbs and a skeleton in his study: “This is Radcliffe’s library.” However, he bequeathed a substantial sum of money to Oxford for the founding of the Radcliffe Library, an endowment which, Samuel Garth quipped, was "about as logical as if a eunuch should found a seraglio."

3. Physician to King William III until 1699, when Radcliffe offended the King by remarking "Why truly, I would not have your Majesty's two legs for your three kingdoms."

Medical institutions named after Radcliffe 
The John Radcliffe Hospital in Oxford is named after John Radcliffe, as was the former Radcliffe Infirmary, now being redeveloped for academic use by Oxford University as the Radcliffe Observatory Quarter.

Works
 Pharmacopoeia Radcliffeana: or, Dr. Radcliff's Prescriptions, Faithfully gather'd from his Original Recipie's To which are annex'd, Useful Observations upon each Prescription. The Second Edition Corrected. . Rivington, London 2nd Ed. by Edward Strother 1716 Free EBook digitized by Google
 Pharmacopoeiae Radcliffeanae Pars Altera: Or, The Second and Last Part of Dr. Radcliff's Prescriptions, with useful Observations, &c. To which is annex'd, An Appendix, Containing a Body of Prescriptions, answering the Intentions requir'd in all Diseases Internal and External, with useful Cautions subjoin'd to each Head, and a complete Index to the Whole. Being a Work of General Use to all Physicians, Apothecaries, and Surgeons. . Rivington, London. by Edward Strother 1716 Free EBook digitized by Google
 Dr. Radcliffe's practical dispensatory : containing a complete body of prescriptions, fitted for all diseases, internal and external, digested under proper heads . Rivington, London 4th Ed. by Edward Strother 1721 Digital edition by the University and State Library Düsseldorf

Further reading 
 Hone, Campbell R. (1950) The Life of Dr. John Radcliffe, 1652–1714, Benefactor of the University of Oxford. London: Faber and Faber.
 Guest, Ivor (1991) Dr John Radcliffe and His Trust. London: The Radcliffe Trust, 595 pages

References

 
 

1652 births
1714 deaths
Politicians from Wakefield
People educated at Queen Elizabeth Grammar School, Wakefield
Alumni of University College, Oxford
British MPs 1713–1715
17th-century English medical doctors
18th-century English medical doctors
English philanthropists
Fellows of Lincoln College, Oxford
English MPs 1690–1695
Members of the Parliament of Great Britain for English constituencies
People associated with University College, Oxford